Saint Joseph Parish may refer to:
Saint Joseph Parish, Barbados
Saint Joseph Parish, Dominica

See also
St. Joseph Church (disambiguation)

Civil parishes in the Caribbean
Parish name disambiguation pages